Mohamad Fazrul Amir bin Md Zaman (born 27 February 2000) is a Malaysian professional footballer who plays for Malaysia Super League club Kelantan as a winger.

Club career

Youth

As a youth player, he joined the youth academy of PKNS.

Kelantan United

Fazrul started his career with Kelantan United. He renewed his contract before the 2021 season.

Kelantan

Before the 2022 season, Fazrul signed for Kelantan. During his first season, he was compared to Malaysia international Mohd Badhri Mohd Radzi. He also received p[raise from manager Rezal Zambery Yahya.
On 5 March 2023, Fazrul scored his first goal for the club in a 2–0 win over Penang.

Style of play

Mainly operating as a winger, he is known for his agility.

Career statistics

Club

References

External links 

2000 births
Living people
People from Kelantan
Association football midfielders
Malaysian footballers
Malaysia Premier League players
Malaysia Super League players
Kelantan United F.C. players
Kelantan F.C. players